Harold James Boyden (19 October 1910 – 26 September 1993) was a British Labour Party politician.

Boyden was educated at Tiffin Boys' School, Kingston upon Thames, and King's College London. He became a barrister, called to the bar by Lincoln's Inn in 1947 and became Director of Extramural Studies at Durham University from 1947 to 1959, serving as chair of the National Institute for Adult Education from 1957 to 1960. Boyden was a councillor on Durham County Council from 1952 to 1960, and a member of the executive of the Fabian Society.

Boyden was Member of Parliament for Bishop Auckland from 1959 to 1979, preceding Derek Foster. 

Boyden was a junior minister for Education and Science from 1964 to 1965, Parliamentary Secretary for Public Building and Works from 1965 to 1967, and junior minister for Defence from 1967 to 1969.

Notes

References
Times Guide to the House of Commons October 1974

External links 
 

1910 births
1993 deaths
Labour Party (UK) MPs for English constituencies
Councillors in County Durham
Alumni of King's College London
Academics of Durham University
UK MPs 1959–1964
UK MPs 1964–1966
UK MPs 1966–1970
UK MPs 1970–1974
UK MPs 1974
UK MPs 1974–1979
People educated at Tiffin School
Ministers in the Wilson governments, 1964–1970